Hit Me may refer to:

 "Hit Me" (song), a 2002 song by Groove Coverage
 Hit Me (The Price Is Right), a game on the game show The Price is Right
 "Hit Me", a song by Suede on their 2013 album Bloodsports
 "Hit Me", a song by The Whigs
 Hit Me (film), a 1996 crime film directed by Steven Shainberg
 Hit Me,  a 2010 short film starring Scott Porter

See also